"Every Little Thing" is a song recorded by American country music singer Russell Dickerson. It is the third single from his 2018 debut album Yours. Dickerson wrote the song with Parker Welling and Casey Brown, the latter of whom also produced it.

Content
Dickerson's wife, Kailey, was the inspiration for the song. He told the blog Pop Culture that "I love every little thing about her, and that's what the song's about. Because when I wrote the album, we were newlyweds." Christina Foster of The Country Note indicated Dickerson's "polished and smooth voice" along with the "clapping beat" and "sweet" lyrics.

Music video
The video was directed by Ben Skipworth, and intersperses concert footage with footage of Russell and Kailey, and shots of him touring Chinatown in Chicago and various places in Grand Rapids, Michigan including Stella’s Lounge (pinball), the Skywalk, and 20 Monroe (concert).

Charts

Weekly charts

Year-end charts

Certifications

References

2018 songs
2018 singles
Russell Dickerson songs
Songs written by Russell Dickerson
Thirty Tigers singles